Ramón Jáuregui Atondo (born 1948) is a Spanish politician. A member of the Spanish Socialist Workers' Party (PSOE), he served as Minister of the Presidency (2010–2011) during the Second Zapatero Government. He also was member of the European Parliament in two separate spells (2009–2010 and 2014–2019).

Biography 
He served as Vice-Lehendakari of the Basque Government from 1987 to 1991.

Jáuregui first served as Member of the European Parliament from 2009 until 2010. During that brief period, he was the Parliament's rapporteur on the European Union's accession to the European Convention on Human Rights.

From 2014 until 2019, Jáuregui served as chair of the Delegation to the Euro-Latin American Parliamentary Assembly and as member of the Committee on Constitutional Affairs. In 2016, he also joined the Parliament's Committee of Inquiry into Money Laundering, Tax Avoidance and Tax Evasion (PANA) that is to investigate the Panama Papers revelations and tax avoidance schemes more broadly.

In addition to his committee assignments, Jáuregui served as a member of the European Parliament Intergroup on Western Sahara.

In March 2018, he announced his will to leave politics. He did not state at the time if that meant to immediately renounce to the MEP seat.

References

Living people
1948 births
MEPs for Spain 2009–2014
MEPs for Spain 2014–2019
Politicians from San Sebastián
Spanish Socialist Workers' Party MEPs
Members of the 1st Basque Parliament
Members of the 4th Basque Parliament
Members of the 5th Basque Parliament
Members of the 7th Congress of Deputies (Spain)
Members of the 8th Congress of Deputies (Spain)
Members of the 9th Congress of Deputies (Spain)
Members of the 10th Congress of Deputies (Spain)
Mayors of places in the Basque Country
Government ministers of the Basque Country (autonomous community)